From Now On is the second album by American singer Robin S., released in 1997. It includes the single "It Must Be Love", which reached No. 91 on the US Billboard Hot 100, number one on the Dance Club Songs chart and No. 35 on the Hot R&B/Hip-Hop Songs chart. "It Must Be Love" was also released in the United Kingdom, where it peaked at No. 37 in the UK Singles Chart. From Now On remains the last studio album by Robin S. to date.

Critical reception

In a review for AllMusic, Leo Stanley gave the album four out of five stars and commented that From Now On "is nearly as accomplished as her debut Show Me Love, thanks to her wonderful voice and the sleek, disco-styled production." He went on to say that "the songs can tend to sound a little similar to each other", but that the album "is infectious and irresistible when at its best." William Stevenson from Entertainment Weekly stated that the singer "outdoes herself here. The disco-style "It Must Be Love" is just one of the CD's danceable tracks. She also lets 'er rip on "Midnight" and "Shine on Me." Except for a few forgettable slow tunes, On energizes like a Power Bar." British magazine Music Week also gave it four out of five, adding that Robin S. "employs her scintillating soul vocal skills on 13 quality tracks, aided by some top notch musicianship."

Track listing

Note
 Tracks 12 and 13 available on CD only.

Charts

References

External links
From Now On at Discogs

1997 albums
Atlantic Records albums